Team ROCCAT was a German professional esports organization with players competing in Counter-Strike: Global Offensive, Heroes of the Storm, League of Legends, and StarCraft II. Its titular sponsor was the German computer accessories manufacturer Roccat GmbH, which was acquired by Turtle Beach in 2019.

League of Legends 

Team ROCCAT entered the professional League of Legends scene after it acquired the roster of the EU LCS team Kiedyś Miałem Team in 2014. The team finished 3rd in the 2014 EU LCS Spring Split and 4th in the 2014 EU LCS Summer Split.

Steeelback joined Team ROCCAT on 29 April 2016.

Team ROCCAT finished last in the 2016 EU LCS Summer Split, forcing them to play through the relegation tournament. However, the team managed to defeat Millenium and FC Schalke 04 to re-qualify for the 2017 EU LCS Spring Split.

The organization announced in late 2018 that it would not apply for a spot in the newly rebranded League of Legends European Championship (LEC). Many of its players and staff later joined Rogue.

Final roster

References 

Defunct and inactive Counter-Strike teams
Defunct and inactive StarCraft teams
Former European League of Legends Championship Series teams
Esports teams based in Germany
Esports teams established in 2007
Esports teams disestablished in 2018